The Thailand Rugby Union (TRU) is the governing body of rugby union in Thailand, recognised by the International Rugby Board. It has its headquarters in Bangkok, and was founded in 1937, affiliating to the International Rugby Board in 1989.

See also
Thailand national rugby union team

References

Rugby union in Thailand
Rugby union governing bodies in Asia
Ru
Organizations based in Bangkok
Sports organizations established in 1937

1937 establishments in Siam